Ffos Las is a rural area between the villages of Carway and Trimsaran, north of the town of Llanelli in the Gwendraeth Valley in Carmarthenshire, Wales.

The Ffos Las area is named after a farm which had existed at the site before mining operations began.  The English translation of ffos las is blue ditch.  Ffos Las was once the site of an open cast mining operation which operated between 1983 and 1997.  At one time, it was the largest open cast mine in Europe and was 500 ft deep.

Ffos Las is now best known for the Ffos Las racecourse which was completed in 2009.  The racecourse is built on top of the in-filled open cast mine.

Future plans
There are proposals by house builders Persimmon to build around 250 houses on a part of the racecourse development site.  69 properties are planned for the first phase of construction.

References

Geography of Carmarthenshire